Karl Schmid may refer to:
 Karl Schmid (artist)
 Karl Schmid (athlete)
 Karl Schmid (rower)

See also
 Karl Schmidt (disambiguation)